Charles McKay was a Rocky Mountain fur trapper of the Hudson Bay Company who came to the Tualatin Valley in Oregon with a group of five other individuals on Christmas day in 1840.

 The party was formed in an effort to gain a foothold for England in the contested Oregon Territory.  The journey was difficult and they made stops at Fort Spokane and originally settled near the town of Dupont before resettling in Oregon. After arriving in Oregon he was one of those alleged to have voted for the creation of a provisional government at what were known as the Champoeg Meetings. He was the founder and first to settle Glencoe, Oregon.

He was married to Letitia Bird, daughter of the governor and former chief factor of the Hudson's Bay Company. Having originally been born in Manitoba, Canada, he became an American citizen in 1851.

References

External links 

 Washington County Historical Society and Museum - Charles Richard McKay
 Charles Richard McKay (1808-1873) - Red River Ancestry
 Charles Richard McKay Sr. (1808-1873) - Find a Grave

1808 births
1873 deaths
Pre-Confederation Canadian emigrants to the United States
Champoeg Meetings
Oregon pioneers
Burials in Oregon
Fur traders
Cattlemen
American people of Scottish descent